In geometry, an apex (plural apices) is the vertex which is in some sense the "highest" of the figure to which it belongs. The term is typically used to refer to the vertex opposite from some "base". The word is derived from the Latin for 'summit, peak, tip, top, extreme end'.

Isosceles triangles
In an isosceles triangle, the apex is the vertex where the two sides of equal length meet, opposite the unequal third side.

Pyramids and cones
In a pyramid or cone, the apex is the vertex at the "top" (opposite the base). In a pyramid, the vertex is the point that is part of all the lateral faces, or where all the lateral edges meet.

References 

Parts of a triangle
Polyhedra